Centurion was launched in 1804. She initially sailed as a West Indiaman. She made one voyage to India. She then sailed between Britain and Quebec City. Centurion was last listed in 1839, but with data stale since 1834. Centurion, Heppinstall, master, was reported sailing t Quebec as late as September 1845.

Career
She first entered Lloyd's Register (LR) in 1804 with Gladstale, master, Tindall, master, and trade London–Jamaica.

Centurion, W.Meade, master, sailed from England in February 1818, bound for Bombay. She sailed under a license from the British East India Company.  sailed for England from the Cape of Good Hope but had to put into St Helena on 22 August 1821, leaky. It was expected that she would be condemned and so her cargo was transshipped on Centurion, Mead, master. Egfrid was surveyed and condemned as a constructive total loss on 28 September. Centurion sailed from St Helena on 29 September and arrived at Deal on 4 December, with Egfrids cargo.

On 17 May 1825 Centurion, Bankier, master, was sailing from Quebec for Bristol when she sprang a leak and was beached on Goose Island, Nova Scotia. She returned to Quebec on 18 May. She then went to Munn's Cove to unload her cargo and undergo repairs.

Fate
Centurion, Heppenstall, master, was wrecked 22 June 1848 at St. Shott's, Newfoundland. Her crew were rescued. She was on a voyage from Quebec City to London. She was described as having been built in 1804 as the 100th vessel built by John Tindall, the father of her present owners, the members of Tindall & Co.

Citations and references
Citations

References

1804 ships
Age of Sail merchant ships of England
Maritime incidents in May 1825
Maritime incidents in June 1848